The State Assembly (Il Tumen) of the Republic of Sakha (Yakutia) is the regional parliament of Sakha, a federal subject of Russia. A total of 70 deputies are elected for five-year terms.

Elections

2018

See also
List of Chairmen of the State Assembly of the Sakha Republic

References

Government of Russia
Politics of the Sakha Republic
Sakha
Sakha